

Head office

The Ministry of Marathi Language is a ministry in government of Maharashtra. Ministry is responsible for the promotion of Marathi language in India as well as abroad. Deepak Kesarkar is current Minister for Marathi Language. Language department offers free Marathi classes to non-Marathi speakers living in Maharashtra.

Departments
Ministry of Marathi Language has one key department - Marathi Bhasha Vibhag (Marathi language department). Separate administrative department was established in 2010.

Child agencies
 Rajya Marathi Vikas Sanstha (State Institute for Marathi Development) 
 Maharashtra Rajy Vishawakosh Nirmiti Mandal
 Maharashtra Rajya Sahitya aani Sankriti Mandal
 Bhasha Sanchanalay (Language Directorate)

Marathi language

Marathi is an Indo-Aryan language spoken predominantly by around 83 million Marathi people of Maharashtra, India. It is the official language and co-official language in the Maharashtra and Goa states of Western India, respectively and is one of the 22 scheduled languages of India. With 83 million speakers as 2011, Marathi ranks 10th in the list of languages with most native speakers in the world. Marathi has the third largest number of native speakers in India, after Hindi and Bengali. The language has some of the oldest literature of all modern Indian languages, dating from around 600 AD. The major dialects of Marathi are Standard Marathi and the Varhadi dialect. The Koli languages (Kachi Koli, Parkari Koli and Wadiyara Koli), Agri and Malvani Konkani have been heavily influenced by Marathi varieties.

Achieving classical language status
In 2004, the Government of India declared that languages that met certain requirements could be accorded the status of a "Classical Language" of India. The Marathi ministry has submitted an application to the Government of India to grant classical language status to Marathi. The Government of India is considering the request.

Initiatives and activities

Awards
Various awards are given to exceptional people in the field of Marathi language.
 Yashwantrao Chavan Award
 Vi. Da. Karandikar Lifetime Achievement Award : Trophy and cash prize of ₹5,00,000
 P. Bhagawat Award : Trophy and cash prize of ₹3,00,000
 Bhasha Sanvardhan (Language Promotion) : Two cash prize awards of ₹1,00,000

Marathi language day
Marathi Language Day (मराठी दिन/मराठी दिवस ) is celebrated on 27 February every year across the Indian states of Maharashtra and Goa. This day is regulated by the Ministry of Marathi language. It is celebrated on the Birthday of eminent Marathi Poet Vi. Va. Shirwadkar, popularly known as Kusumagraj.

Essay competitions and seminars are arranged in schools and colleges, and government officials are asked to conduct various events.

Use of Marathi in government offices
Ministry made it compulsory to use Marathi language in all Government of Maharashtra offices.

Marathi in schools
The Maharashtra Compulsory Teaching and Learning of Marathi Language in Schools Bill, 2020 was proposed by the Marathi ministry and passed by the Government of Maharashtra unanimously. Marathi language classes are mandatory in all schools of Maharashtra.

International collaboration
Internationalization efforts started in 2021 to engage international Marathi diaspora. Department launched various initiatives to popularize Marathi language outside India. US Consul General was felicitated for promoting US based organizations working in Marathi language.

Head office

List of Cabinet Ministers

List of Ministers of State

List of Principal Secretaries

See also 
 Marathi language
 Local government in Maharashtra

References

External links

Government ministries of Maharashtra
Maharashtra-related lists
Marathi language
Language advocacy organizations